Brownstone is a building material. The term is also used in the United States to refer to a townhouse clad in this material.

Brownstone may also refer to:

Brownstone (group), an American R&B group
Brownstone (musical), a 1979 musical
Brownstone (surname)
Brownstone Productions, a production company founded in 2002 by actor and producer Elizabeth Banks
"Mr. Brownstone", a Guns N' Roses song
"Brownstone", slang for impure illicit recreational drug mixtures such as black tar heroin, which can have a brown or dark coloration from impurities, whence the name of the Guns N' Roses song
Brown Stone, a neighborhood in Beijing, China